Vinyon is a synthetic fiber made from polyvinyl chloride.  In some countries other than the United States, vinyon fibers are referred to as polyvinyl chloride fibers.  It can bind non-woven fibers and fabrics.  It was invented in 1939.

It has the same health problems associated with chlorinated polymers.  In the past, Vinyon was used a substitute for plant-based filters in tea bags.

Vinyon fiber characteristics
 doesn't flame, but softens at low temperatures(55 C)
 high resistance to chemicals
 Moisture absorption is less than 0.5% and moisture regained is less than 0.1%
 crease resistant and elastic

Major vinyon fiber uses
 industrial applications as a bonding agent for non-woven fabrics and products

Production
The U.S. Federal Trade Commission definition for vinyon fiber is "A manufactured fiber in which the fiber-forming substance is any long chain synthetic polymer composed of at least 85 percent by weight of vinyl chloride units (—CH2—CHCl—)."

First U.S. commercial vinyon fiber production: 1939, FMC Corporation, Fiber Division (formerly American Viscose Corporation).

See also
 Textile

References

Synthetic fibers